Legislative and local elections were held in El Salvador on 11 March 2012 to choose 84 members of the legislative assembly and 262 mayors. The election was carried out by the Supreme Electoral Tribunal. The opposition Nationalist Republican Alliance (ARENA) narrowly defeated the Farabundo Martí National Liberation Front (FMLN) and its ally Grand Alliance for National Unity (GANA).

Background
Following the 2009 presidential election, the first ever president from the Farabundo Martí National Liberation Front (FMLN), Mauricio Funes, was elected following the end of the Salvadoran civil war.

This election was seen as a test of Funes' government since it was the first election since he came to power. Prior to the election, the FMLN controlled the Legislative Assembly in alliance with Grand Alliance for National Unity (GANA), dissidents from the conservative Nationalist Republican Alliance (ARENA).

Parties
In addition to ARENA, FMLN and GANA, six smaller parties fielded candidates. ARENA is led by Alfredo Cristiani, a former president during the civil war; FMLN is led by Medardo González, a former guerrilla chief; and GANA is led by former member of ARENA and president Elías Antonio Saca.

The National Conciliation Party and the Christian Democratic Party were both dissolved by a Supreme Court of Justice verdict in 2011. Technically, they would have been deregistered after their electoral setback in 2004 (less than 3%), but a 2005 decree saved them from being folded and allowed them to carry on. The Supreme Court ruled this decree to be unconstitutional and eventually disbanded the parties. However, both parties continued their political work and registered as the National Coalition and Party of Hope, respectively.

Campaign
ARENA's campaign issues included a tough response to criminal and youth gangs, which was a concern with 14 murders a day, according to government figures. FMLN campaigned on promises of social programmes and job creation, where unemployment is 34% (though down from 40% before Funes took office).

In January, Funes appointed army General Francisco Salinas to replace Carlos Ascencio, who had resigned to join the foreign service, as head of the national police. For this, Funes was criticised by members of his own party who alleged that appointing someone from the military to head the police was in contravention of both the Constitution of El Salvador and the Chapultepec Peace Accords.

Opinion polls
The Central American University carried out an opinion poll which showed the FMLN alliance was leading with 27.8%, but closely followed by ARENA with 26.4%. According to a CID-Gallup poll for the daily newspaper La Página, carried out from 16 to 19 February, ARENA had the support of 34% of voters, FMLN followed with 32% of the voters and GANA, a faction of ARENA, was third with 10% of the voters.

Results
The voting stations were scheduled to open from 7:00 to 17:00, but many opened late. After voting, Funes called on the electorate to help him "guarantee that the changes that are taking place are strengthened, and not turned back."

Legislative election

Municipal elections
The election also chose mayors of 262 towns and cities.

After the polls closed, but before the Supreme Electoral Tribunal had published the official results, ARENA candidate and the incumbent mayor Norman Quijano declared himself winner of the mayoral race in the capital, San Salvador. He beat the FMLN's Jorge Shafick Handal, the son of former FMLN leader Schafik Handal.

Of the 14 district capitals, ARENA won control of nine town halls, FMLN won control of three town halls, while GANA and the National Coalition each won control of one town hall.

By municipality

Reaction
San Salvador's re-elected mayor Norman Quijano called the result "historic" and announced that the party was "going to turn the country around."

Analysis
A strong showing for ARENA was read as a hindrance to Funes' implementation of his social programmes.

The president and his FMLN administration are likely to be dependent on the support of GANA, which has already helped the government with passing fiscal reform bills during the last legislators' term. The Christian Science Monitor read the result as a "litmus test" for President Mauricio Funes before the next presidential election.

References

Legislative elections in El Salvador
Legislative and local
El Salvador